Sylvain Guillaume (born 6 July 1968 in Champagnole, Jura) is a former French nordic combined skier who competed during the 1990s. At the 1992 Winter Olympics in Albertville he won a silver in the 15 km individual, then a bronze in the 4 x 5 km team competition at the 1998 Winter Olympics in Nagano. He also won a bronze medal in the 15 km individual at the 1995 FIS Nordic World Ski Championships in Thunder Bay, Ontario.

External links
 
 

1968 births
Living people
People from Champagnole
French male Nordic combined skiers
Olympic Nordic combined skiers of France
Nordic combined skiers at the 1992 Winter Olympics
Nordic combined skiers at the 1994 Winter Olympics
Nordic combined skiers at the 1998 Winter Olympics
Olympic medalists in Nordic combined
FIS Nordic World Ski Championships medalists in Nordic combined
Medalists at the 1998 Winter Olympics
Medalists at the 1992 Winter Olympics
Olympic silver medalists for France
Olympic bronze medalists for France
Sportspeople from Jura (department)